Ideford (or Ideford Parish) is a village in the Teignbridge district of Devon, England. To the west is the A380 dual carriageway and to the east are Luton and Teignmouth Golf Club.

It is home to the Royal Oak pub (owned by Heavitree Brewery), the grade II listed Ideford Church, Ideford Village Hall (a converted schoool), and the Millennium Green. Ideford Village Hall (a converted schoool),

References  

Villages in Devon
Civil parishes in Devon
Teignbridge